The raid on Amarr, also known as the Raid on Ghatafan, occurred directly after the Invasion of Sawiq in the year A.H. 3 of the Islamic calendar, March 624. The expedition was ordered by Muhammad after he received intelligence that the Banu Muharib and Banu Thalabah tribes were planning to raid the outskirts of Madinah. Therefore, Muhammad launched a pre-emptive strike with 450 men.

When the enemies heard of the imminent arrival of Muhammad, they quickly fled. The Muslims also captured a man who later converted to Islam and acted as their guide.

This event is mentioned in Ibn Hisham's biography of Muhammad, and other historical sources.

Background
A month after the Invasion of Sawiq, Muhammad learnt that some clans of the Ghatafan tribesmen had gathered troops at Dhu Amar in Nejd. So, Muhammad led an expedition of 450 fighters to search out the enemy and disperse them. He left Uthman in charge of Medina.

This was the largest military exercise led by Muhammad prior to the Battle of Uhud.

Raid
However, the enemy got wind of Muhammad’s departure and took to hiding. Muhammad’s army was able to capture one man who gave information about the Ghatafan’s hideout. The enemy soon heard of Muhammad’s approach and they took sanctuary on the tops of the hills.

Attempted assassination

Attempted assassination in Quran
According to the Muslim scholar Sami Strauch, it is reported in Sahih Bukhari that it was raining, and Muhammad took his garments off and hung them on a tree to dry, while the enemy was watching, Ghwarath ibn al-Harith went to attack Muhammad. He threatened Muhammad with his sword and said "Who will protect you from me on this day?" Then according to Muslim scholars the Angel Gabriel came and thumped Ghawrath in the chest and forced him to drop his sword. Muhammad then picked up the sword and said "Who will protect you from me?"

Ghawrath replied: "No one, and I testify there is no God worthy of worship but Allah" and he then converted to Islam. The Quran says regarding this incident:

Muhammad spent 11 days on this expedition and then returned to Medina.

Attempted assassination in Hadith
Sahih al Bukhari mentions this incident:

Attempted assassination in Biographical literature
This incident is also mentioned in Ibn Sa'd Kitab Al-tabaqat Al-Kabir, Volume 2.

See also
List of expeditions of Muhammad

Notes

624
Campaigns led by Muhammad
Angelic apparitions